Rysselberghe may refer to:

 Van Rysselberghe family, Belgian family of artists
 Théo van Rysselberghe (1862–1926), Belgian neo-impressionist painter, after whom is named:
 18643 van Rysselberghe, an asteroid.
 Bernard Van Rysselberghe (1905–1984), Belgian cyclist.
 Dorian van Rijsselberghe (born 1988), Dutch sailor.
 Jacqueline van Rysselberghe (born 1965), Chilean politician.